The Seybold Baking Company Factory, also known as Columbia Baking Company or Southern Bakeries Factory, is a historic building at 800 Orange Avenue in Daytona Beach. It was added to the National Register of Historic Places on October 30, 1997. The property is part of the Daytona Beach Multiple Property Submission.

The Seybold Baking Company was founded in Miami by John Seybold.

See also
National Register of Historic Places listings in Volusia County, Florida

References

Buildings and structures in Daytona Beach, Florida
National Register of Historic Places in Volusia County, Florida
Commercial buildings on the National Register of Historic Places in Florida
1927 establishments in Florida
Commercial buildings completed in 1927